Together Again was a British television comedy/music variety series which aired for six episodes in 1957. It starred Bud Flanagan and Chesney Allen. The half-hour series was produced by Jack Hylton for Associated-Rediffusion. The series survives intact but has yet to appear on home video.

References

External links
 Together Again at IMDb

British variety television shows
1957 British television series debuts
1957 British television series endings
1950s British television series
Black-and-white British television shows
Television shows produced by Associated-Rediffusion
English-language television shows